The 1945 Soviet First League was the first post-war season and the fifth since the establishing of the second tier. The tier was named the Second Group which before carried name Group B.

After the Great Patriotic War some team managed to preserve themselves since the last season which was played five years ago in 1940. The following teams returned to the league Spartak Leningrad, Pishchevik Odessa, Torpedo Gorky, Dinamo (Spartak) Yerevan. The rest 14 teams were newly formed. Notable is the fact that season saw participation of two teams from the Moscow Military District (VVS and MVO) both of which finished at the top of season table, yet missing a promotion after allowing Krylya Sovetov to squeeze by.

League standings

Number of teams by republics

See also
 Soviet First League
 1945 Soviet First Group

External links
 1945 Soviet Second Group. RSSSF.

1936
2
Soviet
Soviet